Crocodile tears are false or insincere displays of emotion.

Crocodile Tears may also refer to:

Crocodile Tears, an Alex Rider novel by Anthony Horowitz
Crocodile Tears, the fictional film within Along Came Polly, a 2004 romantic comedy film
"Crocodile Tears", a 2007 song from Tangled Up (Girls Aloud album)
"Crocodile Tears", a 1990 country song from Lee Roy Parnell (album)

See also
Larme de Crocodile, a 1997 Shibuya-kei album by Kahimi Karie
Luha ng Buwaya ("Crocodile's Tear"), a Tagalog-language novel by Amado V. Hernandez